FC Stal-2 Alchevsk was a Ukrainian football team based in Alchevsk, Ukraine. The club has been featured regularly in the Ukrainian Second Division it serves as a junior team for the FC Stal Alchevsk franchise. Like most tributary teams, the best players are sent up to the senior team, meanwhile developing other players for further call-ups.

FC Stal Alchevsk
Defunct football clubs in Ukraine
Stal-2 Alchevsk
Association football clubs established in 2000
Association football clubs disestablished in 2003
2000 establishments in Ukraine
2003 disestablishments in Ukraine